The 2012 Porsche Carrera Cup Deutschland season was the 27th German Porsche Carrera Cup season. It began on 28 April at Hockenheim and finished on 21 October at the same circuit, after seventeen races, with two races at each event bar Round 3. It ran as a support championship for the 2012 DTM season. René Rast won his second championship ahead of his teammate countryman Sean Edwards at an action packed final round. This was the first season in the championship with two races at each event supporting the DTM rounds. The B-class was introduced for the first time for amateur drivers.

Teams and drivers

Race calendar and results

1# – Race stopped due to torrential rain resulting in only half points being awarded.

2# – Sean Edwards recorded the fastest lap but was not counted due to being disqualified from the race.

Championship standings

A-class

† — Drivers did not finish the race, but were classified as they completed over 90% of the race distance.

B-class

External links
The Porsche Carrera Cup Germany website
Porsche Carrera Cup Germany Online Magazine

Porsche Carrera Cup Germany seasons
Porsche Carrera Cup Germany